The Purple Heart (PH) is a United States military decoration awarded in the name of the President to those wounded or killed while serving, on or after 5 April 1917, with the U.S. military. With its forerunner, the Badge of Military Merit, which took the form of a heart made of purple cloth, the Purple Heart is the oldest military award still given to U.S. military members. The National Purple Heart Hall of Honor is located in New Windsor, New York.

History
The original Purple Heart, designated as the Badge of Military Merit, was established by George Washington – then the commander-in-chief of the Continental Army – by order from his Newburgh, New York, headquarters on 7 August 1782. The Badge of Military Merit was only awarded to three Revolutionary War soldiers by Washington himself. Washington authorized his subordinate officers to issue Badges of Merit as appropriate. Although never abolished, the award of the badge was not proposed again officially until after World War I.

On 10 October 1927, Army Chief of Staff General Charles Pelot Summerall directed that a draft bill be sent to Congress "to revive the Badge of Military Merit". The bill was withdrawn and action on the case ceased on 3 January 1928, but the office of the Adjutant General was instructed to file all materials collected for possible future use. A number of private interests sought to have the medal re-instituted in the Army; this included the board of directors of the Fort Ticonderoga Museum in Ticonderoga, New York.

On 7 January 1931, Summerall's successor, General Douglas MacArthur, confidentially reopened work on a new design, involving the Washington Commission of Fine Arts. Elizabeth Will, an Army heraldic specialist in the Office of the Quartermaster General, was named to redesign the newly revived medal, which became known as the Purple Heart. Using general specifications provided to her, Will created the design sketch for the present medal of the Purple Heart. The new design, which exhibits a bust and profile of George Washington, was issued on the bicentennial of Washington's birth.

The Commission of Fine Arts solicited plaster models from three leading sculptors for the medal, selecting that of John R. Sinnock of the Philadelphia Mint in May 1931. By Executive Order of the President of the United States, the Purple Heart was revived on the 200th Anniversary of George Washington's birth, out of respect to his memory and military achievements, by War Department General Order No. 3, dated 22 February 1932.  
 
The criteria were announced in a War Department circular dated 22 February 1932, and authorized award to soldiers, upon their request, who had been awarded the Meritorious Service Citation Certificate, Army Wound Ribbon, or were authorized to wear Wound Chevrons subsequent to 5 April 1917, the day before the United States entered World War I. The first Purple Heart was awarded to MacArthur. During the early period of American involvement in World War II (8 December 1941 – 22 September 1943), the Purple Heart was awarded both for wounds received in action against the enemy and for meritorious performance of duty. With the establishment of the Legion of Merit, by an Act of Congress, the practice of awarding the Purple Heart for meritorious service was discontinued. By , dated 3 December 1942, the decoration was applied to all services; the order required reasonable uniform application of the regulations for each of the Services. This executive order also authorized the award only for wounds received. For both military and civilian personnel during the World War II era, to meet eligibility for the Purple Heart, AR 600–45, dated 22 September 1943, and 3 May 1944, required identification of circumstances.

After the award was re-authorized in 1932 some U.S. Army wounded from conflicts prior to the First World War applied for, and were awarded, the Purple Heart: "...veterans of the Civil War and Indian Wars, as well as the Spanish–American War, China Relief Expedition (Boxer Rebellion), and Philippine Insurrection also were awarded the Purple Heart. This is because the original regulations governing the award of the Purple Heart, published by the Army in 1932, provided that any soldier who had been wounded in any conflict involving U.S. Army personnel might apply for the new medal. There were but two requirements: the applicant had to be alive at the time of application (no posthumous awards were permitted) and he had to prove that he had received a wound that necessitated treatment by a medical officer."

Subject to the approval of the Secretary of Defense, dated 12 February 1952, revised authorizations to include the Service Secretaries. Dated 25 April 1962, included provisions for the posthumous award of the Purple Heart. Dated 23 February 1984, authorized award of the Purple Heart as a result of terrorist attacks, or while serving as part of a peacekeeping force, subsequent to 28 March 1973.

On 13 June 1985, the Senate approved an amendment to the 1985 Defense Authorization Bill, which changed the precedence of the Purple Heart award, from immediately above the Good Conduct Medal to immediately above the Meritorious Service Medals. Public Law 99-145 authorized the award for wounds received as a result of friendly fire. Public Law 104-106 expanded the eligibility date, authorizing the award of the Purple Heart to a former prisoner of war who was wounded after 25 April 1962. The National Defense Authorization Act for the Fiscal Year 1998 (Public Law 105-85) changed the criteria to delete authorization for the award of the Purple Heart to any non-military U.S. national serving under competent authority in any capacity with the Armed Forces. This change was effective 18 May 1998.

During World War II, 1,506,000 Purple Heart medals were manufactured, many in anticipation of the estimated casualties resulting from the planned Allied invasion of Japan. By the end of the war, even accounting for medals lost, stolen, or wasted, nearly 500,000 remained. To the present date, the total combined American military casualties of the seventy years following the end of World War II—including the Korean and Vietnam Wars—have not exceeded that number. In 2000, there remained 120,000 Purple Heart medals in stock. The existing surplus allowed combat units in Iraq and Afghanistan to keep Purple Hearts on hand for immediate award to soldiers wounded in the field.

In 2009 National Geographic estimated the number of Purple Hearts given as:

World War I: 320,518
World War II: 1,076,245
Korean War: 118,650
Vietnam War: 351,794
Persian Gulf War: 607
Afghanistan War: 12,534 (as of 18 November 2018)
Iraq War: 35,411 (as of 18 November 2018)
Operation Inherent Resolve: 76 (as of 4 May 2020)
United Nations Multidimensional Integrated Stabilization Mission in Mali, MINUSMA super camp attack: 2

7 August of every year is recognized as "National Purple Heart Day."

On June 14, 2017, the 242nd birthday of the Army, Byron Derringer's efforts over a number of years to have his great grandfather, 95th Aero Squadron Commander and Army Captain James Ely Miller, recognized for the Distinguished Flying Cross (DFC) were successful. Miller, the first American aviator killed in action during World War I, received the DFC posthumously and is now the first and only recipient to have received it for its intended purpose. This achievement resulted in a change to the history of both the DFC and the Purple Heart.  Captain James Ely Miller, by his sacrifice, became the first U.S. airman eligible for the Purple Heart to die in air-to-air combat against an enemy, while serving in an armed force of the United States.

Criteria

The Purple Heart is awarded in the name of the President of the United States to any member of the Armed Forces of the United States who, while serving under competent authority in any capacity with one of the U.S. Armed Services after 5 April 1917, has been wounded or killed. Specific examples of services which warrant the Purple Heart include:any action against an enemy of the United States;
any action with an opposing armed force of a foreign country in which the Armed Forces of the United States are or have been engaged;
while serving with friendly foreign forces engaged in an armed conflict against an opposing armed force in which the United States is not a belligerent party;
as a result of an act of any such enemy or opposing armed forces; or
<li>as a result of an act of any hostile foreign force.

As many were being killed or wounded while serving in that capacity in South Vietnam, and because the United States was not formally a participant of the war (until 1965), there was no "enemy" to satisfy the requirement of a wound or death received "in action against an enemy". In response, President John F. Kennedy signed the executive order that awarded to any person wounded or killed "while serving with friendly foreign forces" or "as a result of action by a hostile foreign force".

After 28 March 1973, it may be awarded as a result of an international terrorist attack against the United States or a foreign nation friendly to the United States, recognized as such an attack by the Secretary of the Army, or jointly by the Secretaries of the separate armed services concerned if persons from more than one service are wounded in the attack. Also, it may be awarded as a result of military operations while serving outside the territory of the United States as part of a peacekeeping force.

The Purple Heart differs from most other decorations in that an individual is not "recommended" for the decoration; rather he or she is entitled to it upon meeting specific criteria. A Purple Heart is awarded for the first wound suffered under conditions indicated above, but for each subsequent award an oak leaf cluster or 5/16 inch star is worn in lieu of another medal. Not more than one award will be made for more than one wound or injury received at the same instant.

A "wound" is defined as an injury to any part of the body from an outside force or agent sustained under one or more of the conditions listed above. A physical lesion is not required; however, the wound for which the award is made must have required treatment by a medical officer and records of medical treatment for wounds or injuries received in action must have been made a matter of official record. When contemplating an award of this decoration, the key issue that commanders must take into consideration is the degree to which the enemy caused the injury. The fact that the proposed recipient was participating in direct or indirect combat operations is a necessary prerequisite, but is not sole justification for award. The Purple Heart is not awarded for non-combat injuries.

Enemy-related injuries which justify the award of the Purple Heart include: injury caused by enemy bullet, shrapnel, or other projectile created by enemy action; injury caused by enemy placed land mine, naval mine, or trap; injury caused by enemy released chemical, biological, or nuclear agent; injury caused by vehicle or aircraft accident resulting from enemy fire; and, concussion injuries caused as a result of enemy generated explosions.

Injuries or wounds which do not qualify for award of the Purple Heart include frostbite or trench foot injuries; heat stroke; food poisoning not caused by enemy agents; chemical, biological, or nuclear agents not released by the enemy; battle fatigue; disease not directly caused by enemy agents; accidents, to include explosive, aircraft, vehicular, and other accidental wounding not related to or caused by enemy action; self-inflicted wounds (e.g., a soldier accidentally or intentionally fires their own gun and the bullet strikes his or her leg), except when in the heat of battle, and not involving gross negligence; post-traumatic stress disorders; and jump injuries not caused by enemy action.

It is not intended that such a strict interpretation of the requirement for the wound or injury to be caused by direct result of hostile action be taken that it would preclude the award being made to deserving personnel. Commanders must also take into consideration the circumstances surrounding an injury, even if it appears to meet the criteria. In the case of an individual injured while making a parachute landing from an aircraft that had been brought down by enemy fire; or, an individual injured as a result of a vehicle accident caused by enemy fire, the decision will be made in favor of the individual and the award will be made. As well, individuals wounded or killed as a result of "friendly fire" in the "heat of battle" will be awarded the Purple Heart as long as the "friendly" projectile or agent was released with the full intent of inflicting damage or destroying enemy troops or equipment. Individuals injured as a result of their own negligence, such as by driving or walking through an unauthorized area known to have been mined or placed off limits or searching for or picking up unexploded munitions as war souvenirs, will not be awarded the Purple Heart as they clearly were not injured as a result of enemy action, but rather by their own negligence.

Animals are generally not eligible for the Purple Heart; however, there have been rare instances when animals holding military rank were honored with the award. An example includes the horse Sergeant Reckless during the Korean War.

Former eligibility 
From 1942 to 1997, non-military personnel serving or closely affiliated with the armed forces—as government employees, Red Cross workers, war correspondents, and the like—were eligible to receive the Purple Heart whether in peacetime or armed conflicts. Among the earliest to receive the award were nine Honolulu Fire Department (HFD) firefighters killed or wounded in peacetime while fighting fires at Hickam Field during the attack on Pearl Harbor. About 100 men and women received the award, the most famous being newspaperman Ernie Pyle who was awarded a Purple Heart posthumously by the Army after being killed by Japanese machine gun fire in the Pacific Theater, near the end of World War II. Before his death, Pyle had seen and experienced combat in the European Theater, while accompanying and writing about infantrymen for the folks back home. Those serving in the Merchant Marine are not eligible for the award.  During World War II, members of this service who met the Purple Heart criteria received a Merchant Marine Mariner's Medal instead.

The most recent Purple Hearts presented to non-military personnel occurred after the terrorist attacks at Khobar Towers, Saudi Arabia, in 1996—for their injuries, about 40 U.S. civil service employees received the award.

However, in 1997, at the urging of the Military Order of the Purple Heart, Congress passed legislation prohibiting future awards of the Purple Heart to non-military personnel. Civilian employees of the U.S. Department of Defense who are killed or wounded as a result of hostile action may receive the new Defense of Freedom Medal. This award was created shortly after the terrorist attacks of September 11, 2001.

Appearance

Above the heart appears a shield of the coat of arms of George Washington (a white shield with two red bars and three red stars in chief) between sprays of green leaves. The reverse consists of a raised bronze heart with the words FOR MILITARY MERIT below the coat of arms and leaves.

Devices

Additional awards of the Purple Heart are denoted by oak leaf clusters in the Army, Air Force, and Space Force, and additional awards of the Purple Heart Medal are denoted by  inch stars in the Navy, Marine Corps, and Coast Guard.

Presentation

Current active duty personnel are awarded the Purple Heart upon recommendation from their chain of command, stating the injury that was received and the action in which the service member was wounded. The award authority for the Purple Heart is normally at the level of an Army Brigade, Marine Corps Division, Air Force wing, Space Force delta, or Navy Task Force. While the award of the Purple Heart is considered automatic for all wounds received in combat, each award presentation must still be reviewed to ensure that the wounds received were as a result of enemy action. Modern day Purple Heart presentations are recorded in both hardcopy and electronic service records. The annotation of the Purple Heart is denoted both with the service member's parent command and at the headquarters of the military service department. An original citation and award certificate are presented to the service member and filed in the field service record.

During the Vietnam War, Korean War, and World War II, the Purple Heart was often awarded on the spot, with occasional entries made into service records. In addition, during mass demobilizations following each of America's major wars of the 20th century, it was common occurrence to omit mention from service records of a Purple Heart award. This occurred due to clerical errors, and became problematic once a service record was closed upon discharge. In terms of keeping accurate records, it was commonplace for some field commanders to engage in bedside presentations of the Purple Heart. This typically entailed a general entering a hospital with a box of Purple Hearts, pinning them on the pillows of wounded service members, then departing with no official records kept of the visit, or the award of the Purple Heart. Service members, themselves, complicated matters by unofficially leaving hospitals, hastily returning to their units to rejoin battle so as not to appear a malingerer. In such cases, even if a service member had received actual wounds in combat, both the award of the Purple Heart, as well as the entire visit to the hospital, was unrecorded in official records.

Service members requesting retroactive awards of the Purple Heart must normally apply through the National Personnel Records Center. Following a review of service records, qualified Army members are awarded the Purple Heart by the U.S. Army Human Resources Command in Fort Knox, Kentucky. Air Force veterans are awarded the Purple Heart by the Awards Office of Randolph Air Force Base, while Navy, Marine Corps, and Coast Guard, present Purple Hearts to veterans through the Navy Liaison Officer at the National Personnel Records Center. Simple clerical errors, where a Purple Heart is denoted in military records, but was simply omitted from a WD AGO Form 53-55 (predecessor to the) DD Form 214 (Report of Separation), are corrected on site at the National Personnel Records Center through issuance of a DD-215 document.

Notable recipients

Bryan Anderson, Iraq War veteran and triple amputee
E.A. "Andy" Andrews, multiple recipient, Mayor of Montreat, NC, author of "A Machine Gunner's War"
James Arness, actor
Manny Babbitt, U.S. marine executed for murder
Peter Badcoe, Victoria Cross, Australian Army
Lex Barker, actor
John Basilone, Marine Corps, WWII, Medal of Honor
Bryan B. Battaglia, Marine Corps, 2nd Senior Enlisted Advisor to the Chairman
Kristin Beck, Former Trans woman and former member of SEAL Team Six
Roy Benavidez, Vietnam war, five Purple Hearts received
Joe Beyrle, American soldier that served with both the United States Army and the Soviet Red Army
Rocky Bleier, NFL, Pittsburgh Steelers
Dan Blocker, actor
Paul Boesch, wrestler and wrestling promoter
Pappy Boyington, Marine Corps pilot
Charles Bronson, actor
Jesse L. Brown, Naval Pilot
J. Herbert Burke, U.S. Representative from Florida
Alwyn Cashe
Mel Casas, artist
Joseph Newton Chandler III, Army, WWII, better known for being an identity thief
John A. Chapman, Medal of Honor
Llewellyn Chilson, Army, 3 awards
David Christian, Army, 7 awards
Wesley Clark, former SACEUR
Max Cleland, U.S. Senator from Georgia
Frank Coker, American football player
Cordelia E. Cook, first woman recipient of the Bronze Star Medal and the Purple Heart
Emma Cope, Former Welsh soldier, Llys Cadwyn war veteran
Dan Crenshaw, U.S. Representative from Texas and former Navy SEAL
Steponas Darius, aviator
Ray Davis, Marine Corps general
Sammy L. Davis, Medal of Honor, Army, 2 awards
DuWayne Deitz, American football player and coach
Ralph E. Dias, USMC, Medal of Honor recipient 
Danny Dietz Navy SEAL in Operation Red Wings     
Bob Dole, Army, 2 awards, former U.S. Senator and Republican presidential candidate
Desmond Doss, WWII, Medal of Honor
Tammy Duckworth, U.S. Senator from Illinois
Donnie Dunagan, actor
Charles Durning, actor
Dale Dye, actor
W. D. Ehrhart, poet and writer
Joe Ellis, Marine Corps, Vietnam war
Thomas Fitzpatrick, US Marine/Army soldier, "Late Night Flight" pilot
John Ford, director
Samuel Fuller, director
James Garner, actor, 2 awards
James M. Gavin, Army Lt. General
Salvatore Giunta, Medal of Honor, Army in Afghanistan war
Calvin L. Graham, USN, WWII, youngest Purple Heart recipient, 12 years old
Harold J. Greene, Army general
Eric Greitens, Navy SEAL, author and former governor of Missouri
Bo Gritz, conservative political activist
Gary Gordon, former member of Delta Force. Medal of Honor recipient
David Hackworth, Army, writer, 8 awards
MJ Hegar, Air Force helicopter pilot, Texas U.S. Senate candidate
Joe Haldeman, writer
Carlos Hathcock, Marine Corps sniper
Riley Howell, student, killed while stopping the UNC-Charlotte shooting
Daniel Inouye, U.S. Senator from Hawaii, Medal of Honor, WWII
Raymond Jacobs, Marine Corps, flag raiser at Iwo Jima
Russell Johnson, actor
James Jones, writer
John F. Kennedy, Navy, WWII, former U.S. Representative and U.S. Senator from Massachusetts and 35th President of the United States
Joseph P. Kennedy Jr., Navy, WWII, older brother of John F. Kennedy
John Kerry, Navy, former U.S. Secretary of State, former U.S. Senator and Lt. Governor from Massachusetts, and 2004 Democratic presidential candidate, 3 awards
Bob Kerrey, U.S. Navy SEAL, U.S. Senator from Nebraska and Medal of Honor recipient
Ron Kovic, marine, writer, anti-war activist
Sharon Ann Lane
Melvin Laird, Navy, WWII, former U.S. Secretary of Defense
Megan Leavey
Robert Leckie, Marine Corps
Marcus Luttrell, Navy SEAL in Operation Red Wings
Aleda E. Lutz, WWII Army flight nurse, second most decorated woman in U.S. history.
Jessica Lynch
Douglas MacArthur, U.S. Army general
Victor Maghakian, also known as Captain Victor "Transport" Maghakian
Karl Marlantes, author, 2 awards
Lee Marvin, actor
Al Matthews, actor
John McCain, Navy, POW during Vietnam, U.S. Senator from Arizona, and former U.S. Representative from Arizona
Doris Miller, Navy Cross recipient for heroic actions during the attack on Pearl Harbor
Parren Mitchell, U.S. Representative from Maryland
Robert Mueller, Marine Corps platoon commander, attorney, FBI director, special counsel
Audie Murphy, Medal of Honor, actor, 3 awards
Michael P. Murphy Medal of Honor, Navy SEAL in Operation Red Wings
Hal Moore, Army General
Tim O'Brien, author, sergeant
Scott O'Grady, Air Force F-16 pilot
Vincent Okamoto, Vietnam war veteran
George S. Patton, general
Thomas Payne, Medal of Honor recipient and member of Delta Force. 
Nick Popaditch, Marine Corps; Silver Star recipient 
Colin Powell, Army general, former United States Secretary of State
Geronimo Pratt, high-ranking member of the Black Panther Party, two Purple Hearts received
Harry Pregerson, judge, United States Court of Appeals for the Ninth Circuit
Ralph Puckett, Medal of Honor
Lewis Burwell "Chesty" Puller, marine  
Larry Thorne, Former Finnish captain and Waffen SS captain. 
Lewis Burwell Puller Jr., Son of Chesty Puller and author of the Pulitzer Prize winning book Fortunate Son
Ernie Pyle, WWI US Naval Reserve, WWII war correspondent
Matthew Ridgway, Army general, Chief of Staff, United States Army
Franklin Delano Roosevelt Jr., Navy, President FDR's son
Theodore Roosevelt Jr., Army, son of President Theodore Roosevelt
Telly Savalas, actor
Al Schmid, Marine Corps
Norman Schwarzkopf Jr., commanding general of Allied forces during Operation Desert Storm
Ben Schwartzwalder, Hall of Fame football coach at Syracuse University
Don W. Sears, dean and professor emeritus of law at the University of Colorado Law School
Sergeant Reckless, Marine war horse of official rank, 2 awards
Rod Serling, screenwriter and TV host
Robert B. Sherman, songwriter
Eric Shinseki, former Army Chief of Staff and secretary of the Veterans Administration
Randy Shughart former Delta Force sniper and Medal of Honor recipient.
Warren Spahn, MLB player
Jan Scruggs, Vietnam War veteran, founder of the Vietnam Veterans Memorial Fund, which built the Vietnam Veterans Memorial in Washington, D.C.
Robert Stethem, killed during TWA Flight 847 hijacking, namesake of USS Stethem
James Stockdale, Navy vice admiral, POW and Medal of Honor recipient
Oliver Stone, Vietnam veteran and film director
Spencer Stone, Air Force staff sergeant, author and actor, who stopped terrorist attack on a train to Paris
William Stuart-Houston, nephew of Adolf Hitler
Sergeant Stubby, Army K9 WWI, 2 awards
Bruce Sundlun, former governor of Rhode Island.
William D. Swenson, Medal of Honor
Pat Tillman, Army Rangers, NFL player
Lauri Törni, Finnish soldier of three armies
Matt Urban, Army, 7 awards
John Paul Vann, Army, State Department official in Vietnam
Jay R. Vargas, Marine Corps, 5 awards
Alexander Vindman, Director for European Affairs for the United States National Security Council
Kurt Vonnegut Jr., author, for injuries due to frost-bite.
Lewis William Walt, Marine Corps general, 2 awards
Jim Webb, Marine Corps, former Secretary of the Navy, U.S. Senator from Virginia, author and Emmy Award-winning journalist, 2 awards
Joshua Wheeler, Army master sergeant, Delta Force member KIA in Iraq
Louis Wilson, Commandant of the Marine Corps and Medal of Honor recipient
Richard Winters, Army major, paratrooper and subject of Band of Brothers
Chuck Yeager, Army Air Forces and Air Force brigadier general
Gordon Yntema, Medal of Honor recipient 
Louis Zamperini, U.S. Olympian 
Tyler Ziegel, Marine Corps sergeant
 Larry Cullen, Marine Corps captain and brother of Peter Cullen

Most Purple Heart awards

Ten Purple Hearts:
Charles D. Barger, U.S. Army, Medal of Honor: World War I (10)
 William G."Bill" White, U.S. Army: World War II (9), Korean War (1)
 Curry T. Haynes, U.S. Army: Vietnam War (10)

Nine Purple Hearts:
 Albert L. Ireland, U.S. Marine Corps: World War II (5), Korean War (4)
Eight Purple Hearts:
Robert T. Frederick, U.S. Army: World War II (8)
David H. Hackworth, U.S. Army: Korean War (3), Vietnam War (5)
Joe Hooper, U.S. Army, Medal of Honor: Vietnam War (8)
Robert L. Howard, U.S. Army, Medal of Honor: Vietnam War (8)
William Waugh, U.S. Army: Vietnam War (8)

See also 
DEA Purple Heart Award
Gold Star Lapel Button
Law Enforcement Purple Heart
Secretary of Defense Medal for the Defense of Freedom
Texas Purple Heart Medal
Thomas Jefferson Star for Foreign Service (State Department)
Wound stripe
List of wound decorations

References

Bibliography
Case Reference Guide regarding verification and issuance of the Purple Heart Medal, Military Personnel Records Center, St. Louis, Missouri

External links

 Army Regulation 670-1: Wear and Appearance of Army Uniform and Insignia
 Purple Heart History
 The Purple Heart: Background and Issues for Congress Congressional Research Service

 
Awards established in 1932
Cultural depictions of George Washington
Military awards and decorations of the United States
Awards and decorations of the United States Air Force
Awards and decorations of the United States Army
Awards and decorations of the United States Coast Guard
Awards and decorations of the United States Marine Corps
Awards and decorations of the United States Navy
Awards and decorations of the United States Space Force
Wound decorations
1932 establishments in the United States